Get Karl! Oh Soo-jung is a 2007 South Korean romantic comedy television series starring Uhm Jung-hwa and Oh Ji-ho. It aired on SBS from July 28 to September 16, 2007 on Saturdays and Sundays at 21:45 for 16 episodes.

The series is based on the real-life love story of Lee Ju-young, the CEO of the drama's production company who reunited with her current husband ten years after breaking up with him. Moreover, Go Man-soo is the actual name of Lee's pro-golfer husband who incidentally instructed Oh Ji-ho on his golf swings in preparation for the role.

Plot
Throughout her school days, Oh Soo-jung (Uhm Jung-hwa) was the girl every boy wanted to date and every girl wanted to be. But having watched her poor family disintegrate after her mother abandoned her incompetent father, Soo-jung naturally became cynical and demanding when it came to picking her choice of man. She dates Go Man-soo (Oh Ji-ho), an Ivy League law student, despite the lack of physical attraction (he is overweight and nerdy). But the moment she finds out that he failed his bar exam, poor Man-soo gets dumped. But eight years later, the tables are turned. Soo-jung, now in her thirties, is no longer in demand. The former "it girl" has since fallen from grace. She manages the jewelry store owned by a less attractive schoolmate who married a lawyer and now barks at Soo-jung every chance she gets.

Man-soo returns from the States a changed man; he has transformed into famous, rich, hunky pro-golfer Karl Go. He hires Jung Woo-tak (Kang Sung-jin) to play a wealthy bachelor, and once Soo-jungs fall in love with him, he's to jilt her at the altar, just like she did to Man-soo. Meanwhile, Karl pretends to be the debt-ridden boyfriend of Soo-jung's boarder Yook Dae-soon (Park Da-an). But his revenge plans go awry when he and Soo-jung fall in love with each other again. On her wedding day to Woo-tak, Soo-jung runs away and chooses Karl despite believing he's poor. Bitter that Karl chose a girdle-clad "old maid" over her, Dae-soon not only steals her creative ideas for jewelry design but reveals to Soo-jung that Karl has been making a fool of her all this time. In the end, Soo-jung triumphs over Dae-soon professionally, then proposes to Karl and they finally get married.

Cast

Main characters
 Oh Ji-ho as Go Man-soo / Karl Go
 Uhm Jung-hwa as Oh Soo-jung
 Kang Sung-jin as Jung Woo-tak
 Park Da-an as Yook Dae-soon

Supporting characters
 Ahn Sun-young as Lee Young-ae, Soo-jung's friend
 Yoo Hye-jung as Kim Pil-sook, Soo-jung's friend
 Sung Dong-il as Jung Seung-gyu, Karl's manager/friend
 Ahn Yong-joon as Choi Soo-hyuk, Soo-jung's younger brother
 Kim Kap-soo as Oh Byung-jik, Soo-jung's father
 Yu Ji-in as Shim Wol-do, Soo-jung's mother
 Kim Dong-kyun as Yoon Dong-kwan, Young-ae's husband
 Jeong Min-jin as Daniel
 Seo Hee-seung as Man-soo's father
 Han Bok-hee as Man-soo's mother

Episode ratings

Soundtrack
성공시대 - Sun
Man To Man (Inst.)
I Love Diamond (Inst.)
Love Line (Inst.)
Sentimental (Inst.)
Grey Shoes (Inst.)
Gloomy Day (Inst.)
Choice Of Love (Inst.)
Warning! (Inst.)
Putting On Make-Up (Inst.)
Regret (Inst.)
Step By Step (Inst.)
Lovely Woman (Inst.)
Sad Movies (Inst.)
Wanted! (Inst.)
Yellow Card (Inst.)
Show Me The Way (Inst.)

International broadcast
 It aired in Vietnam on HTV3 from October 13, 2008, under the title Sự trả thù ngọt ngào.

See also
 List of South Korean dramas

References

External links
  
 

Seoul Broadcasting System television dramas
2007 South Korean television series debuts
2007 South Korean television series endings
Korean-language television shows
South Korean romantic comedy television series
Television shows written by Park Hye-ryun
Television shows written by Park Ji-eun
Television series based on actual events
Television series by Doremi Entertainment